Sotere, also known as Saint Sotere, (Rome, Western Roman Empire 3rd century AD – 304 AD) is a saint, virgin, and martyr venerated in the Roman Catholic Church. Her feast day is 11 February.

Life 

Sotere was a relative of Saint Ambrose, according to what the latter proudly wrote in his works, De virginibus and Exhortatio virginis.

Death and burial 
Sotere was brought before magistrates following the anti-Christian edicts issued by the Roman emperors Diocletian and Maximian. Sotere had not obeyed orders to burn idols, and she was therefore outraged, tortured, and finally decapitated. The Martyrologium Hieronymianum states that Sotere was initially buried on the Appian Way, and Pope Sergius II later transferred the relics to the church of San Martino ai Monti in Rome.

References 

Sotere
304 deaths
Catholic martyrs
Ante-Nicene Christian female saints